Rasteh Kenar (also Romanized as Rāsteh Kenār; also known as Rastokutar) is a village in Kasma Rural District, in the Central District of Sowme'eh Sara County, Gilan Province, Iran. At the 2006 census, its population was 423, in 128 families.

References 

Populated places in Sowme'eh Sara County